XHRA-FM is a radio station in Guadalajara. Broadcasting on 89.9 MHz, XHRA-FM is owned by MegaRadio and is known as Magia Digital.

History
Rafael J. Rubio González obtained the station's concession in 1972. The station, originally on 89.1 MHz, played a similar mix of music to XESP-AM 1070 as "Stereo Soul". In the 1980s and 1990s, XHRA was a rock station. In 1996, it was sold to Frecuencia Modulada de Occidente; the new ownership eventually made the change to the present format.

References

Radio stations in Guadalajara